Elena Igorevna Bunina (born 12 May 1976) is a Russian businesswoman. She was the CEO of Yandex from 2017 to 2022. She resigned her position two weeks early. Following her resignation, she moved to Israel following the 2022 Russian invasion of Ukraine.

Biography

Early life and education 
Elena Bunina was born May 12, 1976 in Moscow. She finished Moscow State School 57, where she later taught mathematical analysis.

Bunina graduated from the Faculty of Mechanics and Mathematics at the Moscow State University in 1998. In 2001, she got a PhD degree in Mathematics at the same faculty.

Family 
Elena Bunina's father, was a historian.  

Bunina is married, she has four children.

References

Yandex people
Living people
1976 births
Businesspeople from Moscow
Russian chief executives
Women chief executives
21st-century Russian businesswomen
21st-century Russian businesspeople
Russian expatriates in Israel
Russian businesspeople in Israel